is one of the private junior Colleges located at Itabashi, Tokyo in Japan. It is one of the 149 junior colleges in Japan set up in 1950 when the junior college system started. It consists of three departments now.

Department and Graduate Course

Departments 
 Department of food and nutrition
 Department of social welfare
 Department of early childhood education

See also 
 Shukutoku University

External links
 Shukutoku Junior College

Private universities and colleges in Japan
Japanese junior colleges
Universities and colleges in Tokyo